Corner Shop Show is a British comedy drama web series that premiered on YouTube in March 2014. The series is created by Islah Abdur-Rahman and consists of continuous episodes uploaded on his YouTube channel CornerShopShow, following the adventures of a young man's transition to fill his father's shoes after becoming the custodian of the family business.

Premise
In mid-2013, the series came to fruition when Islah Abdur-Rahman was with a friend who, like Malik in the series, was taking care of a family business whilst his father was away on business. Whilst they were in the shop, Abdur-Rahman began mind mapping a new series.

Development
The original music is provided by Mike Tan, the theme song features vocals by the creator, director and writer of the series, Islah Abdur-Rahman alongside former UK Beatbox Champion MC Zani. As the series ventured into its second season, the team included singer/songwriter Sonna Rele & Sauce

In August 2014, Episodes 1 and 2 of Corner Shop Show were removed from YouTube because Abdur-Rahman did not think they had the same production level as Episode 3 onwards and wanted to take the series in a new direction. The series had its television premiere on Christmas Eve 2014 on Brit Asia TV. When reaching the ninth Episode, Abdur-Rahman launched a crowd funding campaign to create Season 2.

Cast and characters

Main
 Islah Abdur-Rahman as Malik: The Corner Shop manager
Michael Truong as Tony Chang: Chinese businessman whose store is shut down so he works at the Corner Shop

Recurring
Sheplo Mozomil as Riaz: University student who helps out at the Corner Shop
Kaysar Miah as Tariq: Malik's best friend
Bilal Shahid as Harry the Hobo: A former Woolworths employee who has an addiction for paracetamol
Hassan Khan as Saif: Owner of the rival shop, Off Licence
Hamzah Jeetooa as Amil: Worker at the rival shop, Off Licence
Samuel Frimpong as Mr. Asante: Ghanaian barber
Yasmin Elizabeth as Shantelliqua: Nail salon beautician
Andrea Martinez as Claudia: Spanish nail salon beautician
Lawrence Ben Walters as Dun Know Dan: Delivery guy
Tindy Grewal as Dun Know Naa-Tin: Delivery guy
David Mullane as Patrick: Fish and Chip Shop Owner
Manpreet Bambra as Shameena Begum: Malik's cousin
Robert Hoang as Kenny Chang: Tony Chang's brother
Can Kabadayi as Mehmet: Corner Shop temp staff
Ameet Chana as Samad: Malik's older brother who visits from Dubai
Nadia Ali as Mum: Malik's mother
3rd Dan Master Askir Zakareah Khan as Sifu: Tony Chang's martial arts master and has an unknown connection with Malik
Inayat Kanji as Khan: Malik's Brother-in-law
Karishma Bhandari as Maleeka: Malik's twin sister

Guest
 Guz Khan as Postman: Postman of the high street
 Rukku Nahar as Meena: School girl, friend of Melis
 Samiz Mustak as Elayna: Receptionist at the High Street Investigation Department
 Char Avell as Bruiser/Jahangeer: Malik's childhood friend
 Kawsar Ahmed as Rafi: Malik's cousin
 Ikramul Hoque as Shafi: Malik's cousin
 Saima Chowdhury as Farzana Begum
 Suli Breaks as himself
 Ashley David as Isaac: Malik's best friend
 Rob Compton as Agent Gully: High Street Investigation Agent
 Tanya Robb as Agent Colder: High Street Investigation Agent
 Janise Sadik as Melis: School girl, friend of Meena
 Tandy Tatter as Tandy Stark
 Babrul Hoque as Grandad: Malik's grandad
 Jez Kaur as Sharon Kaur: Malik's neighbour
 Naresh Kumar as Zack: Security Guard for the Corner Shop
 Jeja Obi Njoku as Dreadman: Sifu's student and Tony Chang's rival
 Amber Doig-Thorne as Jayda: Former manager of Woolworths

Episodes

 Episode 1: Its My First Day
 Episode 2: Rules are Rules
 Episode 3: The Unexpected Inspector
 Episode 4: May The Best Man Win
 Episode 5: Get Your Facts Straight
 Episode 6: Become The Carrom Board
 Episode 7: Eid Mubarak
 Episode 8: We Have Bigger Concerns
 Episode 9: The Beginning Of The End
 Episode 10: Oh Brother
 Episode 11: You Khan’t Touch This
 Episode 12: Funny & Furious
 Episode 13: Zombie's On The High Street
 Episode 14: Thank You, Come Again

Music

Soundtrack
The soundtrack of the Corner Shop Show contains original and parody music, all of which are created by Mistah Islah.

 Off License Theme Song is a parody of "Main Hoon Don" by Shankar–Ehsaan–Loy
 Hold On, We're Gonna Be Late is a parody of "Hold On, We're Going Home by Drake
 50% Off (Happy - Pharrell Williams Parody) - Islah Abdur-Rahman & MC Zani ft. Ashley David
 See You Again - Wiz Khalifa Parody - Malik Begum (Islah Abdur-Rahman) ft. Tommy
 Man Like Malik - Malik Begum (Islah Abdur-Rahman)

Original music
 Welcome To The Corner Shop - Mike Tan
 Corner Shop Stac - Mike Tan
 Boss, You Need To See This - Mike Tan
 Where Were You When I Needed You - Mike Tan
 Sifu - Mike Tan
 Previously On Corner Shop - Mike Tan
 Do You See The Boy - Mike Tan
 It Ain't Over Unless I Quit Trying - Mike Tan
 Losing A Friend - Mike Tan
 Blueprints - Mike Tan
 Satsui-No-Such-Thing - Mike Tan
 Tony vs Dreadman - Mike Tan
 The Chosen One - Mike Tan
 We're In This Together - Mike Tan
 End Credits Theme - Mike Tan

Series overview

Spin-offs

As of October 2015, a miniseries called Corner Shop Express was launched. It aimed to bring weekly videos for its viewers.
 Episode 1: 5p Plastic Bags and Illegal Segways
 Episode 2: Wedding Shopping
 Episode 3: Halloween Special
 Episode 4: Tony Chang - Draw My Life
 Episode 5: Bounce Back Newham
 Episode 6: Malik - Draw My Life
 Episode 7: Man Like Malik
 Episode 8: Grandad's Punishment
 Episode 9: Sharon's Shanti

The Corner Shop Show YouTube channel eventually dissolved into The CS Network in early 2019 as Islah Abdur-Rahman conversed about plans of launching other series and spin-offs.

In other media
The Corner Shop has been featured in other comedy series and songs. In April 2015, Malik (Islah Abdur-Rahman) was a character in the web series called Mandem On The Wall, directed by himself, where the shop was featured. In July 2014, Malik (Islah Abdur-Rahman) and Tony (Michael Truong) were characters in the 7th episode of the web series, As We Proceed by Sunny and Shay where the shop was also featured. In late 2015, Malik, Tony and the Corner Shop were featured in Iksy's parody music video alongside Mumzy Stranger, Humza Arshad, Bengali Blitz, Puremovements and Char Avell. In 2017, Malik and Tony appeared on Raxstar's music video for his song "King Midas". In March 2018, Malik (Islah Abdur-Rahman), Tony (Michael Truong) and Mehmet (Can Snatchy Kabadayi) featured in Humza Arshad's parody of the viral Nike advertisement, known as "Nothing Beats A Londoner", featuring notable Londoners from underrepresented minorities such as Juggy D, H-Dhami, Tasha Tah, Sevaqk, Bobby Friction, Raxstar, Tez Ilyas, Arjun, Steel Banglez, Char Avell, Jay Sean, Mumzy Stranger and Naughty Boy.

See also
Diary of a Bad Man
 British Bangladeshis

References

External links

2014 web series debuts
British comedy web series
British drama web series
2010s YouTube series
British television sitcoms
English-language television shows
Chinese-language television shows
Hindi-language television shows
British Bangladeshi mass media
Television series set in shops